Claude Becker Wasserstein (born January 8, 1964) is a French-American investor, producer and philanthropist.

Career 

Wasserstein is the founder and CEO of Fine Day Ventures, an early stage venture capital firm investing in technology – specifically financial technology, medical technology and aerospace technology – artificial intelligence and energy (alternative and traditional). She has invested in a number of startups, including Blade, Hyperloop, Flare (board member), Maven, Ambulnz, BitPesa, and Tentrr.

Prior to her investment career, Wasserstein was a producer for CBS News, where she worked in the network's Dubai, Belfast, London, and Paris bureaus. During her time at CBS News, she won an Emmy for an investigative series titled Bad Medicine,  which focused on healthcare in the U.S.

Wasserstein began her career as a journalist for Newsweek, working out of the publication's Paris bureau.

Personal life

Wasserstein was born and raised in France, where she attended the Paris-Sorbonne University and the École du Louvre. She lived and worked in Paris, Dubai, Belfast and London, before moving to New York, New York in the early 1990s.

Wasserstein is the former wife of Bruce Wasserstein, an American investment banker, businessman, and writer. She resides in New York City with her two children and niece.

In 2017, Wasserstein was awarded the insignia Chevalier of the Legion of Honor, France's highest order of merit for military and civil merits, at a ceremony held at the Cultural Services of the French Embassy in New York.

Philanthropy 

Wasserstein has been involved with a number of charities and non-profit organizations. She is a trustee of the King Hussein Cancer Center, a member of New York Presbyterian Hospital’s President's Council and sits on the board of the MET International Council, the American Hospital in Paris Foundation and the Brookings Institution. She is a WNET Channel 13 Life Trustee. She is also a member of the Council on Foreign Relations.

Sources 

1962 births
American investors
Living people